Margo Burns is a historian (A.B., Mount Holyoke College, 1980, M.A., University of New Hampshire, 1991) specializing in the Salem witch trials and related events, especially those in North Andover. She is an Associate Editor and Project Manager of the book Records of the Salem Witch-Hunt (Bernard Rosenthal, Editor, Cambridge University Press, 2009). She resides in New Hampshire.

Biography
Although not directly related to any of those accused in North Andover, Burns is the great-x10-granddaughter of Rebecca Nurse, one of the foremost protagonists of the trials in Salem; it was Burns's initial interest in that controversy that led her to explore its North Andover analog. She puts the total accused in the 1692 event at 153.

Burns appears in several history documentaries about the Salem witchcraft trials: "Salem Witch Hunt: Examine the Evidence" (2011) for the Essex National Heritage Commission and the National Park Service, and "Salem: Unmasking the Devil" (2011) with author Katherine Howe, discussing the case of Rebecca Nurse, for the National Geographic Channel. It aired on the BBC under the alternate title "Salem Witch Trials Conspiracy". In 2016, she appeared, along with historian Mary Beth Norton, in Season 7, Episode 2, of the TLC cable television series, "Who Do You Think You Are?" discussing actor Scott Foley's ancestor, Samuel Wardwell of Andover, MA, who was one of the 19 people hanged for witchcraft during the Salem witchcraft trials of 1692. She appeared a second time on this show, with Emerson Baker, in 2018 in Season 9, Episode 7, speaking with actress Jean Smart about her ancestor, Dorcas Hoar of Beverly, MA, who was also convicted at Salem but never executed. On June 10, 2017, Burns appeared with Emerson Baker, Marilynne K. Roach, and others at a symposium at Salem State University, in Salem, Massachusetts,  commemorating the 325th anniversary of the events: "Salem’s Trials, Lessons and Legacy of 1692," which was recorded by C-SPAN 3 and aired on July 16, 2017.

References

Further reading
Bridgman, Pat. "Don't believe everything you read in the (Salem witchcraft) papers".  Newsletter of the Rebecca Nurse Homestead Preservation Society, Summer 2006.
Burns, Margo, and Bernard Rosenthal. "Examination of the Records of the Salem Witch Trials".  William and Mary Quarterly, Vol. 65, No. 3 (2008). pp. 401–422.
Chase, Elibet Moore. "Trials and Errors". University of New Hampshire Magazine, Spring 2004.
Messenger, Brian. "Researcher unearths Andover's role in witchcraft trials." The Lawrence Eagle-Tribune, 26 October 2008.
Rosenthal, Bernard, ed., et al. Records of the Salem Witch-Hunt. Cambridge UP, 2009. 

Living people
Year of birth missing (living people)
21st-century American historians
Mount Holyoke College alumni
Salem witch trials
University of New Hampshire alumni
American women historians
21st-century American women writers